Hexahydroporphine is an organic chemical compound with formula .  The molecule consists of four pyrrole rings connected by methylene bridges  into a larger (non-aromatic) macrocycle ring, which makes it one of the simplest tetrapyrroles, and the simplest "true" one.  As indicated by the name, it may be viewed as derived from porphine by the addition of six hydrogen atoms: four on the methine bridges, and two on the nitrogen atoms.

Hexahydroporphine does not occur in nature, but is the core of porphyrinogens such as uroporphyrinogen III (UROGEN), which are precursors of many porphyrins — derivatives of porphine of great biological importance.  The six hydrogens of that core are removed at a later metabolic stage by the enzyme protoporphyrinogen oxidase.  Because of this connection, the compound is also called (unsubstituted) porphyrinogen.

The compound is a colorless solid, soluble in dichloromethane, acetone, and diethyl ether. It decomposes at 185°C.

Preparation
Derivatives of hexahydroporphine, with various groups attached to the pyrrole or methylene bridges, occur in nature and have been studied for a long time.  The unsubstituted compound, however, has been synthesized in good yield only in 2001.  It can be obtained by successive condensations of 2,5-bis(hydroxymethyl)pyrrole and pyrrole, with a tripyrrole intermediate.

The compound can also be prepared by reduction of porphin-zinc complexes.

See also
 Tetrahydroporphine

References

Tetrapyrroles